Petar Vorkapić (born 15 March 1995) is a Serbian professional basketball player who last played for Zlatibor of the Basketball League of Serbia.

Petar grew up with Crvena zvezda youth teams and signed his first professional contract in April 2013.

References

External links
 Profile at eurobasket.com
 Profile at euroleague.net

1995 births
Living people
Basketball players from Belgrade
Basketball League of Serbia players
KK Crvena zvezda youth players
KK FMP players
KK Sloga players
KK Zlatibor players
Serbian expatriate basketball people in North Macedonia
Serbian men's basketball players
Point guards